Al-Oud, alternatively al-ʼUd is a residential neighborhood and a subject of Baladiyah al-Batha in southern Riyadh, Saudi Arabia. Spread across 291 hectares, its popular for hosting the famous al-Oud cemetery. It shares borders with Gabrah and al-Bateha neighborhoods to the west and as-Salhiyah and Ghubairah neighborhoods to the east.

References 

Neighbourhoods in Riyadh